Asuridoides atuntseica is a moth of the subfamily Arctiinae. It was described by Franz Daniel in 1951. It is found in Yunnan, China.

References

Lithosiini
Moths described in 1951
Moths of Asia